Thomas Overington Walker (7 December 1933 – 26 May 2016) was an Anglican priest and author.

Walker was educated at Keble College, Oxford and Oak Hill Theological College and ordained in 1960. After curacies in Woking and St Leonards he was travelling secretary of the Inter-Varsity Fellowship from 1964 until 1967; Succentor at Birmingham Cathedral; and then vicar of Harborne from 1970 until his appointment as archdeacon.

Walker has been named in connection with sexual abuse of a female church worker during his time at Harborne.

Notes 

1933 births
Alumni of Keble College, Oxford
Alumni of Oak Hill College
Archdeacons of Nottingham
Living people